The Braille pattern dots-2345 is a 6-dot braille cell with the top right, both middle, and bottom left dots raised, or an 8-dot braille cell with the top right, both upper-middle, and the lower-middle left dots raised. It is represented by the Unicode code point U+281e, and in Braille ASCII with T.

Unified Braille

In unified international braille, the braille pattern dots-2345 is used to represent an unvoiced dental or alveolar plosive, such as /t/ or /t̪/, and otherwise as needed.

Table of unified braille values

Other braille

Plus dots 7 and 8

Related to Braille pattern dots-2345 are Braille patterns 23457, 23458, and 234578, which are used in 8-dot braille systems, such as Gardner–Salinas and Luxembourgish Braille.

Related 8-dot kantenji patterns

In the Japanese kantenji braille, the standard 8-dot Braille patterns 3567, 13567, 34567, and 134567 are the patterns related to Braille pattern dots-2345, since the two additional dots of kantenji patterns 02345, 23457, and 023457 are placed above the base 6-dot cell, instead of below, as in standard 8-dot braille.

Kantenji using braille patterns 3567, 13567, 34567, or 134567

This listing includes kantenji using Braille pattern dots-2345 for all 6349 kanji found in JIS C 6226-1978.

  - 戸

Variants and thematic compounds

  -  selector 1 + と/戸  =  髟
  -  selector 2 + と/戸  =  卜
  -  selector 3 + と/戸  =  并
  -  selector 4 + と/戸  =  長
  -  selector 5 + と/戸  =  豆
  -  selector 6 + と/戸  =  廾
  -  と/戸 + selector 1  =  居
  -  と/戸 + selector 2  =  老
  -  と/戸 + selector 5  =  考
  -  と/戸 + selector 6  =  尸
  -  数 + と/戸  =  廿
  -  比 + と/戸  =  斗

Compounds of 戸

  -  と/戸 + れ/口  =  啓
  -  と/戸 + け/犬  =  戻
  -  れ/口 + と/戸 + け/犬  =  唳
  -  て/扌 + と/戸 + け/犬  =  捩
  -  い/糹/#2 + と/戸 + け/犬  =  綟
  -  と/戸 + ほ/方  =  房
  -  と/戸 + を/貝  =  所
  -  と/戸 + む/車  =  扇
  -  火 + と/戸 + む/車  =  煽
  -  と/戸 + 火  =  炉
  -  と/戸 + ⺼  =  肩
  -  と/戸 + い/糹/#2  =  雇
  -  と/戸 + お/頁  =  顧
  -  い/糹/#2 + と/戸 + れ/口  =  綮
  -  ふ/女 + と/戸 + れ/口  =  肇
  -  と/戸 + 宿 + へ/⺩  =  扁
  -  と/戸 + 囗 + ひ/辶  =  扈
  -  と/戸 + selector 4 + 火  =  扉
  -  き/木 + 龸 + と/戸  =  枦
  -  の/禾 + 龸 + と/戸  =  粐
  -  ふ/女 + 宿 + と/戸  =  舮
  -  心 + 宿 + と/戸  =  芦
  -  か/金 + 宿 + と/戸  =  鈩

Compounds of 髟

  -  と/戸 + う/宀/#3  =  髪
  -  と/戸 + と/戸 + う/宀/#3  =  髮
  -  と/戸 + う/宀/#3 + ま/石  =  鬘
  -  と/戸 + 宿  =  髯
  -  と/戸 + 龸  =  鬢
  -  せ/食 + と/戸 + う/宀/#3  =  髦
  -  も/門 + と/戸 + う/宀/#3  =  髱
  -  と/戸 + selector 4 + ち/竹  =  髢
  -  と/戸 + 宿 + ほ/方  =  髣
  -  と/戸 + ぬ/力 + 囗  =  髫
  -  と/戸 + 宿 + れ/口  =  髭
  -  と/戸 + selector 6 + め/目  =  髴
  -  と/戸 + た/⽥ + selector 5  =  髷
  -  と/戸 + つ/土 + れ/口  =  髻
  -  と/戸 + 心 + こ/子  =  鬆
  -  と/戸 + う/宀/#3 + す/発  =  鬚
  -  と/戸 + う/宀/#3 + る/忄  =  鬟
  -  と/戸 + け/犬 + selector 5  =  鬣

Compounds of 卜

  -  日 + と/戸  =  卓
  -  る/忄 + と/戸  =  悼
  -  な/亻 + 日 + と/戸  =  倬
  -  れ/口 + 日 + と/戸  =  啅
  -  て/扌 + 日 + と/戸  =  掉
  -  き/木 + 日 + と/戸  =  棹
  -  い/糹/#2 + 日 + と/戸  =  綽
  -  す/発 + 日 + と/戸  =  罩
  -  れ/口 + と/戸  =  占
  -  や/疒 + れ/口 + と/戸  =  岾
  -  て/扌 + れ/口 + と/戸  =  拈
  -  に/氵 + れ/口 + と/戸  =  沾
  -  ま/石 + れ/口 + と/戸  =  砧
  -  ち/竹 + れ/口 + と/戸  =  笘
  -  く/艹 + れ/口 + と/戸  =  苫
  -  せ/食 + れ/口 + と/戸  =  鮎
  -  の/禾 + れ/口 + と/戸  =  黏
  -  ほ/方 + と/戸  =  外
  -  ひ/辶 + ほ/方 + と/戸  =  迯
  -  を/貝 + と/戸  =  貞
  -  仁/亻 + と/戸  =  偵
  -  し/巿 + を/貝 + と/戸  =  幀
  -  ま/石 + を/貝 + と/戸  =  碵
  -  ね/示 + を/貝 + と/戸  =  禎
  -  ひ/辶 + を/貝 + と/戸  =  遉
  -  え/訁 + と/戸  =  訃
  -  は/辶 + と/戸  =  赴
  -  な/亻 + 宿 + と/戸  =  仆
  -  つ/土 + 宿 + と/戸  =  卦
  -  き/木 + 宿 + と/戸  =  朴
  -  し/巿 + 宿 + と/戸  =  帖
  -  ま/石 + 宿 + と/戸  =  站

Compounds of 并

  -  な/亻 + と/戸  =  併
  -  い/糹/#2 + と/戸  =  絣
  -  せ/食 + と/戸  =  餅
  -  と/戸 + か/金  =  瓶
  -  と/戸 + 宿 + と/戸  =  屏
  -  と/戸 + う/宀/#3 + ぬ/力  =  剏
  -  つ/土 + 龸 + と/戸  =  垪
  -  ⺼ + 宿 + と/戸  =  胼
  -  ひ/辶 + 宿 + と/戸  =  迸
  -  せ/食 + せ/食 + と/戸  =  餠
  -  そ/馬 + 龸 + と/戸  =  駢

Compounds of 長

  -  ゆ/彳 + と/戸  =  張
  -  に/氵 + ゆ/彳 + と/戸  =  漲
  -  し/巿 + と/戸  =  帳
  -  ら/月 + と/戸  =  脹
  -  る/忄 + selector 4 + と/戸  =  悵
  -  心 + selector 4 + と/戸  =  萇
  -  け/犬 + 宿 + と/戸  =  套
  -  と/戸 + 宿 + ふ/女  =  肆

Compounds of 豆

  -  す/発 + と/戸  =  登
  -  に/氵 + と/戸  =  澄
  -  火 + と/戸  =  燈
  -  や/疒 + す/発 + と/戸  =  嶝
  -  心 + す/発 + と/戸  =  橙
  -  ま/石 + す/発 + と/戸  =  磴
  -  か/金 + す/発 + と/戸  =  鐙
  -  や/疒 + と/戸  =  痘
  -  た/⽥ + と/戸  =  豊
  -  た/⽥ + た/⽥ + と/戸  =  豐
  -  み/耳 + た/⽥ + と/戸  =  軆
  -  せ/食 + た/⽥ + と/戸  =  鱧
  -  お/頁 + と/戸  =  頭
  -  と/戸 + や/疒  =  短
  -  と/戸 + は/辶  =  鼓
  -  と/戸 + と/戸 + は/辶  =  皷
  -  よ/广 + selector 5 + と/戸  =  厨
  -  心 + selector 5 + と/戸  =  荳
  -  う/宀/#3 + selector 5 + と/戸  =  豌
  -  ひ/辶 + selector 5 + と/戸  =  逗
  -  よ/广 + 宿 + と/戸  =  廚
  -  と/戸 + す/発 + selector 1  =  鼕
  -  と/戸 + 宿 + す/発  =  豎

Compounds of 廾

  -  け/犬 + と/戸  =  奔
  -  く/艹 + け/犬 + と/戸  =  莽
  -  む/車 + け/犬 + と/戸  =  蠎
  -  む/車 + と/戸  =  弁
  -  や/疒 + む/車 + と/戸  =  峅
  -  へ/⺩ + と/戸  =  弄
  -  れ/口 + へ/⺩ + と/戸  =  哢
  -  氷/氵 + と/戸  =  弊
  -  と/戸 + 囗  =  戒
  -  え/訁 + と/戸 + 囗  =  誡
  -  き/木 + と/戸  =  械
  -  め/目 + と/戸  =  算
  -  く/艹 + と/戸  =  葬
  -  も/門 + と/戸  =  開
  -  と/戸 + へ/⺩ + つ/土  =  弉
  -  と/戸 + り/分 + の/禾  =  彜
  -  と/戸 + 龸 + の/禾  =  彝
  -  ち/竹 + 宿 + と/戸  =  笄
  -  ぬ/力 + 宿 + と/戸  =  舁
  -  む/車 + 宿 + と/戸  =  蟒

Compounds of 居

  -  な/亻 + と/戸 + selector 1  =  倨
  -  て/扌 + と/戸 + selector 1  =  据
  -  ね/示 + と/戸 + selector 1  =  裾
  -  み/耳 + と/戸 + selector 1  =  踞
  -  か/金 + と/戸 + selector 1  =  鋸

Compounds of 老

  -  ふ/女 + と/戸  =  姥
  -  れ/口 + と/戸 + selector 2  =  咾
  -  心 + と/戸 + selector 2  =  蓍
  -  む/車 + と/戸 + selector 2  =  蛯
  -  と/戸 + 日  =  者
  -  と/戸 + ち/竹  =  箸
  -  と/戸 + く/艹  =  著
  -  つ/土 + と/戸 + く/艹  =  墸
  -  み/耳 + と/戸 + く/艹  =  躇
  -  な/亻 + と/戸 + 日  =  偖
  -  け/犬 + と/戸 + 日  =  奢
  -  心 + と/戸 + 日  =  楮
  -  に/氵 + と/戸 + 日  =  渚
  -  氷/氵 + と/戸 + 日  =  瀦
  -  め/目 + と/戸 + 日  =  睹
  -  か/金 + と/戸 + 日  =  赭
  -  も/門 + と/戸 + 日  =  闍
  -  と/戸 + こ/子  =  孝
  -  と/戸 + 氷/氵  =  教
  -  れ/口 + と/戸 + こ/子  =  哮
  -  と/戸 + selector 4 + せ/食  =  耄
  -  と/戸 + selector 4 + に/氵  =  耆
  -  と/戸 + selector 4 + ゆ/彳  =  耋
  -  と/戸 + め/目 + 宿  =  覩
  -  せ/食 + 宿 + と/戸  =  鰭

Compounds of 考

  -  と/戸 + て/扌  =  拷
  -  き/木 + と/戸 + selector 5  =  栲

Compounds of 尸

  -  と/戸 + へ/⺩  =  屈
  -  つ/土 + と/戸  =  堀
  -  て/扌 + と/戸  =  掘
  -  な/亻 + と/戸 + へ/⺩  =  倔
  -  や/疒 + と/戸 + へ/⺩  =  崛
  -  う/宀/#3 + と/戸 + へ/⺩  =  窟
  -  と/戸 + と/戸  =  展
  -  ま/石 + と/戸 + と/戸  =  碾
  -  む/車 + と/戸 + と/戸  =  輾
  -  ひ/辶 + と/戸  =  遅
  -  と/戸 + ね/示  =  尉
  -  と/戸 + 心  =  慰
  -  火 + と/戸 + ね/示  =  熨
  -  く/艹 + と/戸 + ね/示  =  蔚
  -  そ/馬 + と/戸  =  屑
  -  と/戸 + 数  =  尻
  -  と/戸 + 仁/亻  =  尼
  -  る/忄 + と/戸 + 仁/亻  =  怩
  -  日 + と/戸 + 仁/亻  =  昵
  -  め/目 + と/戸 + 仁/亻  =  眤
  -  と/戸 + せ/食  =  尾
  -  き/木 + と/戸 + せ/食  =  梶
  -  と/戸 + に/氵  =  尿
  -  と/戸 + も/門  =  局
  -  み/耳 + と/戸 + も/門  =  跼
  -  と/戸 + 比  =  屁
  -  と/戸 + た/⽥  =  届
  -  と/戸 + と/戸 + た/⽥  =  屆
  -  と/戸 + ゆ/彳  =  屋
  -  し/巿 + と/戸 + ゆ/彳  =  幄
  -  に/氵 + と/戸 + ゆ/彳  =  渥
  -  ん/止 + と/戸 + ゆ/彳  =  齷
  -  と/戸 + し/巿  =  屍
  -  と/戸 + み/耳  =  属
  -  と/戸 + と/戸 + み/耳  =  屬
  -  め/目 + と/戸 + み/耳  =  矚
  -  と/戸 + る/忄  =  屡
  -  と/戸 + そ/馬  =  層
  -  と/戸 + す/発  =  履
  -  と/戸 + 宿 + こ/子  =  孱
  -  と/戸 + の/禾 + selector 1  =  屎
  -  と/戸 + 宿 + と/戸  =  屏
  -  と/戸 + 宿 + は/辶  =  屐
  -  と/戸 + 宿 + を/貝  =  屓
  -  そ/馬 + 宿 + と/戸  =  犀
  -  の/禾 + 宿 + と/戸  =  穉
  -  ひ/辶 + ひ/辶 + と/戸  =  遲

Compounds of 廿

  -  よ/广 + と/戸  =  庶
  -  心 + よ/广 + と/戸  =  蔗
  -  み/耳 + よ/广 + と/戸  =  蹠
  -  と/戸 + ろ/十  =  革
  -  と/戸 + ぬ/力  =  靱
  -  と/戸 + ふ/女  =  鞍
  -  と/戸 + ら/月  =  覇
  -  龸 + と/戸 + ろ/十  =  鞏
  -  え/訁 + と/戸 + ろ/十  =  鞫
  -  と/戸 + 宿 + ぬ/力  =  勒
  -  と/戸 + selector 1 + ゑ/訁  =  靫
  -  と/戸 + selector 1 + ぬ/力  =  靭
  -  と/戸 + 仁/亻 + 比  =  靴
  -  と/戸 + 囗 + 仁/亻  =  靹
  -  と/戸 + き/木 + selector 5  =  靺
  -  と/戸 + selector 4 + 日  =  靼
  -  と/戸 + selector 4 + ひ/辶  =  鞁
  -  と/戸 + も/門 + selector 2  =  鞄
  -  と/戸 + け/犬 + お/頁  =  鞅
  -  と/戸 + 数 + へ/⺩  =  鞆
  -  と/戸 + う/宀/#3 + 龸  =  鞐
  -  と/戸 + そ/馬 + ⺼  =  鞘
  -  と/戸 + み/耳 + に/氵  =  鞜
  -  と/戸 + 心 + selector 2  =  鞠
  -  と/戸 + き/木 + よ/广  =  鞣
  -  と/戸 + の/禾 + 火  =  鞦
  -  と/戸 + 宿 + 氷/氵  =  鞨
  -  と/戸 + 仁/亻 + な/亻  =  鞭
  -  と/戸 + り/分 + 囗  =  鞳
  -  と/戸 + 宿 + ひ/辶  =  鞴
  -  と/戸 + ひ/辶 + た/⽥  =  韃
  -  と/戸 + は/辶 + さ/阝  =  韆
  -  と/戸 + す/発 + ひ/辶  =  韈
  -  と/戸 + 龸 + せ/食  =  鷓

Compounds of 斗

  -  り/分 + と/戸  =  斜
  -  ろ/十 + と/戸  =  斡
  -  の/禾 + と/戸  =  科
  -  心 + の/禾 + と/戸  =  萪
  -  む/車 + の/禾 + と/戸  =  蝌
  -  と/戸 + の/禾  =  料
  -  て/扌 + 比 + と/戸  =  抖
  -  囗 + 比 + と/戸  =  斛
  -  も/門 + 比 + と/戸  =  斟
  -  む/車 + 比 + と/戸  =  蚪
  -  お/頁 + 宿 + と/戸  =  魁

Other compounds

  -  こ/子 + と/戸  =  事
  -  こ/子 + こ/子 + と/戸  =  亊
  -  さ/阝 + と/戸  =  陶
  -  ね/示 + と/戸  =  礼
  -  ね/示 + ね/示 + と/戸  =  禮
  -  囗 + と/戸  =  同
  -  心 + と/戸  =  桐
  -  ち/竹 + と/戸  =  筒
  -  ⺼ + と/戸  =  胴
  -  か/金 + と/戸  =  銅
  -  る/忄 + 囗 + と/戸  =  恫
  -  に/氵 + 囗 + と/戸  =  洞
  -  の/禾 + 囗 + と/戸  =  粡
  -  ぬ/力 + と/戸 + 宿  =  剳
  -  て/扌 + と/戸 + 宿  =  搭
  -  と/戸 + と/戸 + 火  =  爐
  -  お/頁 + お/頁 + と/戸  =  顱
  -  と/戸 + 宿 + 仁/亻  =  丱
  -  て/扌 + 宿 + と/戸  =  掏
  -  に/氵 + 宿 + と/戸  =  淘
  -  い/糹/#2 + 宿 + と/戸  =  綯
  -  心 + 龸 + と/戸  =  萄
  -  selector 4 + む/車 + と/戸  =  辧
  -  む/車 + む/車 + と/戸  =  辨
  -  む/車 + 龸 + と/戸  =  辯
  -  と/戸 + 宿 + せ/食  =  鳶

Notes

Braille patterns